Paanajärvi National Park is a Russian national park in the Loukhsky District of northwestern Republic of Karelia, in northwestern Russia.

The park was established in 1992.  It has received a PAN Parks certificate.

Geography
Paanajärvi National Park is located in the Maanselka hills of Karelia Region, along the Finnish–Russian border, northern Europe.

It protects  of pristine Scandinavian and Russian Taiga ecoregion forest habitats, lakes, and rivers. Nuorunen, the highest point of Karelia, is located in the park area.

Oulanka National Park 
Oulanka National Park is adjacent on the west along the border, within Finland, with contiguous protection of this Karelian Taiga habitat.

See also
National parks of Russia
National parks of Finland
Taiga and boreal forests

References

External links
 Parks.karelia.ru: Paanajärvi National Park website—(Russian)
Oopt.info: Paanajärvi National Park

Loukhsky District
National parks of Russia
Geography of the Republic of Karelia
Taiga and boreal forests
Protected areas established in 1992
Tourist attractions in the Republic of Karelia